The Grupo Especial de Operaciones Federales (Federal Operations Special Group, GEOF) is a police tactical unit of the Policía Federal Argentina trained to strategically perform counterterrorist and counternarcotics missions. It is also used for VIP protection and hostage rescue situations.

The GEOF is a specialized police unit of the General Directorate of International Terrorism and Complex Crimes. Although the existence of special forces in Argentina begins in 1930, the unit was officially created after the 1994 AMIA bombing. In 1994 its first section was established in Tucumán and in 1997 a second division was constituted in Rosario. In the next year the Buenos Aires group was formed.

The unit's main training course stands for 20 weeks and is divided in two periods, with only 15% common approvals. Topics include sniping, HALO/HAHO parachuting, martial arts, offensive driving, and explosives, known as the "brechero" one. The GEOF constantly trains with special units of other countries like the FBI Hostage Rescue Team, the US Army Green Berets, the Israeli Yamam and numerous SWAT groups. The GEOF, nicknamed 4T (todo tiempo-todo terreno, all weather-all terrain), has full powers in all jurisdictions of the country.

Equipment
The basic gear for every GEOF officer is a standard sidearm and an assault rifle. GEOF would gain other weaponry including shotguns, sniper rifles, and even machine guns (in some units) depend on the situation encountered.

The following are the common weapons used by GEOF:

Firearms
Pistols
 Glock 17
 Beretta 92
 Bersa Thunder 9
 Heckler & Koch USP
Submachine guns
 Heckler & Koch MP5
Assault rifles
 SG 552 Commando
 IWI ACE-N 22
Battle rifles
 FN FAL
Shotguns
 Remington Model 870
Machine guns
 FN MAG
 FN Minimi
 IWI Negev
Sniper rifles
 M24 Sniper Weapon System
 M110 Semi-Automatic Sniper System
 H-S Precision HTR

Vehicles
Iveco Daily
Ford Ranger 
BDX
Dongfeng CSK-131

See also

References

Federal law enforcement agencies of Argentina
Non-military counterterrorist organizations
Police tactical units